Bob Jongen (14 May 1927 – 1 January 2023) was a German-born Dutch footballer, who played as a forward.

Biography
Jongen was born in Aachen, Germany, but grew up in the Dutch town of Kerkrade. He played with Roda JC, Alemannia Aachen, Fortuna 54 and Roda Sport. During his time in Aachen, he also obtained his training diploma at the German Sport University Cologne. After his career he was a scout and referee supervisor at Roda JC. He also owned a hotel and dance hall Le Caveau in Geleen.

In 2018, Jongen told his story in the program Lex ontmoet… at RTV Parkstad.

Death
Jongen died on 1 January 2023, at the age of 95.

References

Other websites
Newspaper image (1961)
Newspaper image (1967)

1927 births
2023 deaths
People from Aachen
Dutch footballers
Association football forwards
Eredivisie players
Roda JC Kerkrade players
Alemannia Aachen players
Fortuna Sittard players
Place of death missing